Diglossocera is a genus of flies in the family Tachinidae.

Species
Diglossocera bifida van der Wulp, 1895

Distribution
India, Indonesia.

References

Diptera of Asia
Exoristinae
Tachinidae genera
Taxa named by Frederik Maurits van der Wulp
Monotypic Brachycera genera